The 2022 World Series of Poker (WSOP) was the 53rd edition of the event and run from May 31-July 20. After being held at the Rio All-Suite Hotel and Casino since 2005, the event moved to Bally's Las Vegas and Paris Las Vegas for the first time.

There were 88 bracelet events on the schedule, including the $10,000 No-Limit Hold'em Main Event beginning on July 3. The series culminated with the Tournament of Champions, a freeroll with a $1 million prize pool open to the year's bracelet and circuit ring winners.

Event schedule

Source: 

Key: (bracelets won in 2022/bracelets won in career)

Michigan Online

Pennsylvania Online

Player of the Year
Final standings as of July 19 (note: does not include events from the 2022 WSOP Online series or the 2022 WSOP Europe series):

* No Player of the Year points were awarded for Jørstad's first bracelet in Event #55.

Main Event
The $10,000 No Limit Hold'em Main Event began on July 3.

Performance of past champions

*- Denotes player who finished in the money

Other notable high finishes
NB: This list is restricted to top 50 finishers with an existing Wikipedia entry.

Final Table

*Career statistics prior to the Main Event

Final Table results

References

External links
Official website

World Series of Poker
World Series of Poker
World Series of Poker